Kurdish grammar has many inflections, with prefixes and suffixes added to roots to express grammatical relations and to form words.

Split-ergative system 
Among all modern Iranian languages, only Yaghnobi and Kurdish are ergative, with respect to both case-marking and verb-agreement. There are general descriptions of ergativity in Kurdish, as well as in specific forms of Kurdish, such as Sorani  and Kurmanjî.

Sorani Kurdish has a split-ergative system. Transitive verbs show nominative/accusative marking in the present tense, and ergative marking in the past tense.

Nouns

Summary 

A Kurdish noun in the absolute state, in other words without any ending of any kind, gives a generic sense of the noun.
 It is also the citation form of the noun, i.e. the form in which a noun is given in a vocabulary list or dictionary.
 Nouns in Kurmanji are declined in four cases: nominative, oblique, construct (or ezafe) and vocative. The distinction of nominative and oblique doesn't exist in Sorani.
 Nouns in Sorani can be simple or compound.
 Any unmodified noun in Kurdish may be generic, i.e., it can refer to one or more than one items. Plural is not obligatory when more than one item are implied.
 For most in Sorani nouns the plural is formed through adding a suffix, some are formed through irregular endings. For Kurmanji, nominative plural is marked by verbs.
 Kurmanji has a paucal number for a few of something, represented by the infix -in-.
 There are 3 grammatical genders in Kurmanji: feminine, masculine and neuter. Sorani has no grammatical gender. Languages like Zazaki and Hawramani have likewise 3 grammatical genders. 
 In Kurmanji, as in many other Indo-European languages, the assignment of noun genders often seems arbitrary and must be memorized by word. However, all nouns derived from infinitives, names of settlements (including countries), nouns being female by nature, and nouns ending in -î are always feminine. These genders also have distinct case endings.
 Definiteness is not formally marked in Kurmanji. In Sorani nouns may be marked with a definite marker (-aka) or an indefinite marker (-ēk). 
 Adjectives agree with the nouns they modify in number and case.
 Personal pronouns are marked for number and person (1st, 2nd, 3rd). They can be free-standing or take the form of clitics. Free-standing forms are used for emphasis.

Possession 
Ezafe is used with nouns to indicate possession. Ezafe (-y) joins the possessive noun with its possessed noun

jēgā-y pāsā = the king's place (Lit: place of king)

Ezafe is also used alongside pronouns to show possession. Ezafe (-y) joins the possessor pronoun with its possessed noun.

jēgā-y min = my place (Lit: place of me)

Pronouns in various Kurdish languages and other languages for comparison 

Oblique

Adjectives 
In Sorani, adjectives follow the head noun and may be joined by 'ezafe' or an open compound structure. The following example shows the Ezafe construction:

pyāw-ī  čak = a good fellow (Lit: man of good)

Demonstrative
Demonstrative pronouns when followed by postpositions (attached to the nouns) become demonstrative adjectives.

As demonstrative adjectives, Sorani Kurdish does not use OBL forms (though for demonstrative pronouns it does use OBL. plural forms); neither Kurmanji uses nominative plural forms.

Prepositions and postpositions

Verbs
Because the stress is distinctive in Kurdish, the acute diacritics (á) are used to denote the stressed syllables (normally not used in Kurdish) .

General description
Kurdish verbs agree with their subjects in person and number. They have the following major characteristics:
 Verbs have two stems: present and past.
 Present stems can be simple or secondary.
 Simple tenses are formed by the addition of personal endings to the two stems.
 Secondary stems consist of a root + suffixes that indicate transitivity, intransitivity, and causativity.
 There are 3 tenses: present, past, and future.
 There are 2 voices: active and passive.
 There are 2 aspects: imperfective and perfective. Aspect is as important as tense.
 There are 4 moods: indicative, conditional, imperative, and potential.
 Past tense transitive sentences are formed as ergative constructions, i.e., transitive verbs in the past tense agree with the object rather than the subject of the sentence.

Non-finite endings

Present and future 

 In the indicative present, augments dí- and ná- are used to make positive and negative forms, respectively (zanî́n → dízanim "I know", názanim "I don't know").
 However, when the stem begins with a- or ê-, dí- drops its last vowel and becomes d- instead (axaftín → dáxavim "I speak"), but such forms also coexist with the non-dropping variant dí- (díaxavim).
 In the subjunctive present, augments bí- and né- is used to make positive and negative forms, respectively (zanî́n → bízanim "should I know"), but unlike the dí augment, this augment does not lost its last vowel except in some dialects.
 The augment bí- is optional for compound verbs. The negative augment né- is also exceptional because it attaches to the verbal parts of the compound (hildán → hilnédim "should I not lift", not *néhildim).
 The present stem (placed to both indicative and subjunctive presents) are usually regular and it takes from the verb's stem, except for some common verbs where it completely irregular and it must learned as a principal part of a verb (xwestín : present xwézim "to want", dîtin : bînim "to see").
 The present stem of verbs with infinitive in -andin, however, end in -în.
 The future tense are formed periphrastically by adding dê or -ê after the nouns or personal pronouns and before the verb. The ending -ê may cause contraction to the pronouns (tu + -ê → tê, tû ê, tiwê; ew + -ê → ewê, wê).

Present tenses for the verb zanîn ("to know"):

Past

Intransitive verbs 

Past tenses for intransitive verb of hatin (to come).

If a past transitive verb accepts a nominative personal suffix, it agrees with the object of the sentence.
Transitive past verbs in Sorani have OBL connected/dependent(not independent) personal pronouns on the object, if object is not mentioned they are on prefix or first part of the verb if the verb was compound, if there were not any prefix so they will be on the same place as th NOM ones.
OBL connected pronouns: -m, -t, -y, -man, -tan, -yan.

Word order
The normal word order in Kurdish is Subject-Object-Verb (S-O-V). Modifiers follow the nouns they modify.

See also

 Elî Teremaxî
 Kurdish alphabets
 Sorani grammar

Notes

References

External links
Learn Kurdish
Kurdish Academy of Language

Kurdish language
Iranian grammars